The 1811 Massachusetts gubernatorial election was held on April 1, 1811.

Elbridge Gerry, the incumbent Democratic-Republican governor, was re-elected to a second term after defeating Federalist nominee Christopher Gore.

General election

Candidates
Elbridge Gerry, Democratic-Republican, incumbent Governor
Christopher Gore, Federalist, former Governor

Results

References

1811
Massachusetts
Gubernatorial